Antal van der Duim and Boy Westerhof were the defending champions but chose not to defend their title.

Wesley Koolhof and Matwé Middelkoop won the title, beating Marco Bortolotti and Kamil Majchrzak 7–6(7–5), 6–4

Seeds

Draw

References
 Main Draw

Copa Sevilla doubles
Copa Sevilla - Doubles